The Polynesian storm petrel (Nesofregetta fuliginosa) is a species of seabird in the family Oceanitidae. It is the only species placed in the genus Nesofregetta.

Markedly polymorphic, several subspecies were described, and light birds were even considered a species on their own (white-throated storm-petrel). Not even subspecies are generally accepted today, however.

It is found in Chile, French Polynesia, Kiribati, New Caledonia, Vanuatu, possibly American Samoa, possibly Fiji, and possibly Samoa.

Its natural habitats are open seas, rocky shores, and sandy shores. It is threatened by introduced predators in its nesting areas.

Taxonomy
The Polynesian storm petrel was formally described in 1789 by the German naturalist Johann Friedrich Gmelin in his revised and expanded edition of Carl Linnaeus's Systema Naturae. He placed it with the other petrels in the genus Procellaria and coined the binomial name Procellaria fuliginosa. Gmelin based his description on the "sooty petrel" that had been described in 1785 by the English ornithologist John Latham in his book A General Synopsis of Birds. The Polynesian storm petrel is now the only species placed in the genus Nesofregetta that was introduced in 1912 by the Australian born ornithologist Gregory Mathews. The name combines the Ancient Greek nēsos meaning "island" and Fregetta, a genus name that was introduced by Charles Lucien Bonaparte in 1855 for the storm petrels. The specific epithet fuliginosa is from Late Latin fuliginosus meaning "sooty". The species is monotypic: no subspecies are recognised.

References

External links
Species factsheet - BirdLife International

Polynesian storm petrel
Birds of Polynesia
Polynesian storm petrel
Polynesian storm petrel
Taxonomy articles created by Polbot